Argyresthia bolliella is a moth of the  family Yponomeutidae. It is found in North America, including Texas.

The wingspan is 10–11 mm. The forewings are white, with dark-brown markings. The hindwings are dark fuscous.

Etymology
The species is named in honor of the collector, Jacob Boll.

References

Moths described in 1907
Argyresthia
Moths of North America